Anne or Ann Evans may refer to:

 Ann Evans (midwife) (1840–1916), New Zealand nurse
 Anne Evans (poet) (1820–1870), English poet and composer
 Anne Evans (arts patron) (1871–1941), art patron in Colorado
 Anne Evans (soprano) (born 1941), British operatic soprano
 Anne Evans Estabrook, American real estate developer

See also
Mary Ann Evans, writer better known as George Eliot
Mary Anne Disraeli, née Evans, wife of Disraeli
Evans (surname)